Margaret Holland (1385 – 30 December 1439) was a medieval English noblewoman. She was a daughter of Thomas Holland, 2nd Earl of Kent, who was the son of Joan "the Fair Maid of Kent" (granddaughter of Edward I of England, wife of Edward the Black Prince and mother of Richard II of England). Margaret's mother was Alice FitzAlan, daughter of Richard FitzAlan, 10th Earl of Arundel and Eleanor of Lancaster.

Margaret married John Beaufort, 1st Earl of Somerset, son of John of Gaunt and his mistress Katherine Swynford. They had six children:
 Henry Beaufort, 2nd Earl of Somerset (1401–1418)
 Joan Beaufort (d. 1445), who married James I of Scotland and Sir James Stewart, the Black Knight of Lorn
 John Beaufort, 1st Duke of Somerset (1404–1444)
 Thomas Beaufort, Count of Perche (c. 1405–1431)
 Edmund Beaufort, 2nd Duke of Somerset (c. 1406–1455)
 Margaret Beaufort (c. 1408–1449), married Thomas de Courtenay, 5th Earl of Devon

In 1399, she was invested as a Lady Companion, Order of the Garter (L.G.). After Beaufort died in 1410 (in the Tower of London), she married his nephew Thomas of Lancaster, Duke of Clarence (1387–1421), the son of King Henry IV. They had no children. She died on 30 December 1439 at St. Saviour's Abbey, Bermondsey, in London, England. Margaret and both her husbands are buried together in a carved alabaster tomb in Canterbury Cathedral that shows her lying between the two of them.

Descendants
Through her son John, the 1st Duke of Somerset, Lady Margaret is an ancestress to the Tudor monarchs.

Ancestry

Footnotes

References

External links
 Margaret Holland profile, our-royal-titled-noble-and-commoner-ancestors.com. Accessed 23 November 2022.

1385 births
1439 deaths
14th-century English women
14th-century English people
15th-century English women
15th-century English people
Margaret Beaufort, Countess of Somerset
English countesses
English duchesses by marriage
Margaret
Wives of knights
Ladies of the Garter